The Roman Catholic Diocese of Kontagora is a Roman Catholic Diocese located in the city of Kontagora in Nigeria.  It is a suffragan see in the Kaduna province.

History
 15 December 1995: Established as the Apostolic Prefecture of Kontagora from the Diocese of Ilorin, Diocese of Minna and Diocese of Sokoto
 21 May 2002: Promoted as Apostolic Vicariate of Kontagora
 2 April 2020: Promoted to Diocese of Kontagora

Leadership
Prefect Apostolic of Kontagora (Roman Rite) 
 Fr. Timothy Joseph Carroll, S.M.A. (December 15, 1995 – April 30, 2002 see below)
 Vicar Apostolics of Kontagora (Roman rite)
 Bishop Timothy Joseph Carroll, S.M.A. (see above April 30, 2002 – April 30, 2010)
 Bishop Bulus Dauwa Yohanna (February 2, 2012 - April 2, 2020 see below)
 Bishops of Kontagora (Roman rite)
 Bishop Bulus Dauwa Yohanna (see above since April 2, 2020)

Special Churches
Saint Michael Cathedral in Kontagora

References
 GCatholic.org  Information
 Catholic Hierarchy

Roman Catholic dioceses in Nigeria
Christian organizations established in 1995
Roman Catholic dioceses and prelatures established in the 20th century
Roman Catholic Ecclesiastical Province of Kaduna